Ajuma Ameh-Otache (1 December 1984 – 10 November 2018) was a Nigerian football midfielder. She was part of the Nigeria women's national football team at the 2004 Summer Olympics. On club level she played for Pelican Stars.

Ameh-Otache died on 10 November 2018 at the age of 33; no details for her cause of death have been given.

See also
 Nigeria at the 2004 Summer Olympics

References

External links

1984 births
2018 deaths
Nigerian women's footballers
Place of birth missing
Footballers at the 2004 Summer Olympics
Olympic footballers of Nigeria
Women's association football midfielders
Nigeria women's international footballers
Pelican Stars F.C. players